The Buhimba–Nalweyo–Kakindu–Bulamagi Road is a road in the Western Region of Uganda, connecting the town of Buhimba in Hoima District with the towns of Nalweyo, Kakindu and Bulamagi, in Kakumiro District.

Location
The road runs in a general southern direction, crosses River Kafu to Nalweyo, in Kakumiro District. The geographical coordinates of this road, immediately west of Nalweyo are: 01°07'24.0"N , 31°15'06.0"E (Latitude:1.123333; Longitude:31.251667).

Overview
This road is one of the roads planned for upgrade and renovation as Uganda prepares the region for oil production, with first oil anticipated in 2021.

Upgrading to tarmac
Prior to 2018, this road was gravel-surface in poor condition, with gullies and pot-holes. In January 2018, the Uganda National Roads Authority awarded the renovation contract to China Wuyi Industrial Company (CWIC). The work is funded with a US$50 million loan from Exim Bank of China.

The upgrading of the road involved the conversion of the then existing gravel surface to  tarmac and the building of bridges and drainage channels, bridges, intersections and related infrastructure. As of April 2018, the contractor was in the pre-construction mobilization stage.

Controversy
In August 2018, the Uganda's Public Procurement and Disposal of Public Assets Authority (PPDA), halted the procurement of an engineering consultant for this road and for the connecting Bulamagi–Igayaza–Kakumiro Road, citing irregularities in the process. The procurement has to be re-advertised from the start.

See also
 Hoima District
 Kakumiro District
 Economy of Uganda
 List of cities and towns in Uganda
 List of roads in Uganda

References

External links
 Bus accident claims four and leaves 28 injured

Roads in Uganda
Western Region, Uganda
Kakumiro District
Hoima District
Transport infrastructure in Uganda